John Williams (born 1907; died after 1964) was a Welsh professional rugby league footballer who played in the 1930s.

Background
Jack Williams was born in Rhos, Cilybebyll, Wales, and he died after 1964.

International honours
Williams won a cap for Wales while at Rochdale Hornets in the 11–18 defeat by France at Stade Chaban-Delmas, Bordeaux, on 1 January 1935.

References

1907 births
20th-century Welsh people
Rochdale Hornets players
Rugby league players from Neath Port Talbot
Rugby league wingers
Wales national rugby league team players
Welsh rugby league players
Year of death missing